Hannes Peckolt (born 18 November 1982 in Ludwigshafen) is a German sailor. He won a bronze medal in 49er class at the 2008 Summer Olympics.

References 

German male sailors (sport)
Sailors at the 2008 Summer Olympics – 49er
Olympic sailors of Germany
Olympic bronze medalists for Germany
1982 births
Living people
Olympic medalists in sailing
Medalists at the 2008 Summer Olympics
Sportspeople from Ludwigshafen